Titcomb Mountain is a ski hill located in Farmington, Maine, in the United States.  It was established in 1939 and is run by the Farmington Ski Club.  The mountain features a 350' vertical drop, 3 lifts (two T-Bars and a Pony lift), 16 trails, snowmaking and night skiing.  Titcomb is a popular local family mountain with an active children's ski school, racing and other activities.

Titcomb Mountain maintains 16 km of cross-country ski trails groomed for skate and classic skiing.

References

External links 
 Titcomb Mountain Official Website

Ski areas and resorts in Maine
Farmington, Maine
Mountains of Franklin County, Maine
Tourist attractions in Franklin County, Maine